USS Tilefish (SS-307), a Balao-class submarine, was the only ship of the United States Navy to be named for the tilefish, a large, yellow-spotted deepwater food fish.

Her keel was laid down on March 10, 1943 at Vallejo, California, by the Mare Island Navy Yard. She was launched on October 25, 1943 sponsored by Mrs. Wilson D. Leggett, and commissioned on December 28, 1943.

First and second war patrols

During February and March 1944, Tilefish underwent trials and shakedown off the California coast before getting underway for Hawaii. On April 3, the submarine departed Pearl Harbor for her first war patrol, setting course for the Japanese home islands. While patrolling in the "Hit Parade" area east of Honshū, Tilefish sighted many enemy aircraft but found few targets for her torpedoes. Early in the patrol, she was hampered by the failure of her fathometer; and, throughout the mission, she was plagued by periscope fogging and overcast weather which ruled out celestial navigation. Finally, on the morning of 11 May, the novice submarine and her crew encountered their first opportunity for action. Tilefish sighted a small convoy and launched a determined attack. Choosing a passenger liner as her target, the submarine unleashed a spread of torpedoes, scoring a hit under the ship's bridge. As Tilefish dove amid the sounds of explosions, she experienced problems which caused her inadvertently to take on a large amount of water. Too deep to be reached by the depth charges of her pursuers, she evaded their attack and continued her patrol.

The son of a Tilefish crew member recalls from his childhood hearing a detailed account of this initial engagement:

“My father, Motor Machinists Mate 2nd Class George Oberhofer, found himself in the thick of things during Tilefish’s first attack.  At the time the target was sighted, repairs to the submarine’s ballast system were underway in her compressor compartment, with one disassembled pipe leaving the compartment in open communication with the sea. As a result, the compartment began to flood during the attack dive.  Had the water level reached the electrical compressor motors, they would have shorted out, leaving her able to surface once but unable to dive again, a sitting duck for enemy destroyers.

”MM2C Oberhofer dove into the flooding compartment to the offending pipe and managed to close it off and get the compartment pumped out before the compressor motors were damaged. For these actions he was awarded a silver star, rare in the submarine service where unit commendations for collective performance were the more typical way to recognize valor in combat.

“My father kept a curious memento from the TIlefish, a tank watch in which the hands had become detached and floated freely around under the crystal. I asked what had happened to his watch and he replied, ‘Depth charges.’ This may shed light on events after the initial attack run.  We may reasonably speculate that Tilefish was under heavy depth charging by Japanese destroyers after sinking her target, and was diving to extreme depths in search of a thermocline—a layer of water  of a sharply different temperature than the water above it.  Thermoclines reflect sonar pings, rendering a submarine that dives below one invisible.  It seems likely that Tilefish successfully found one at 580 feet and slipped away because of it.”

Finding further contact with the enemy to be very light, Tilefish requested another patrol area and was assigned to the northern Mariana Islands where she searched for targets on May 19 and 20th. She completed this patrol at Majuro on May 29, 1944.

After a refitting by submarine tender , Tilefish departed Majuro on June 22, 1944 and headed with an attack group for the Luzon Strait area. On the morning of July 18, Tilefish launched a torpedo attack on a large convoy Hi-69 and had the satisfaction of seeing a freighter sustain two hits. Meanwhile, Rock had joined in the attack and was being held down by a destroyer of the convoy's screen. At 10:50, Tilefish made a torpedo attack on the destroyer. Seeing their wakes, the enemy ship attempted to evade the torpedoes, but the first hit under its forward mount and wrapped her bow around the bridge. A second hit added to the destroyer's damage. Before Tilefish was forced down by enemy aircraft, she caught one last glimpse of the destroyer, listing and dead in the water. Nine minutes later, the submarine made a periscope sweep and found no sign of the enemy ship. The enemy ship, frigate CD-17, survived her damage, however.

In the days that followed, the submarine patrolled the waters east of Formosa attempting to intercept the convoy which she had damaged on July 18. On  July 26, Tilefish surfaced just at the moment when Sawfish launched a three-torpedo attack on Japanese submarine I-29 (one of only six Axis powers submarines to attempt trans-oceanic Yanagi missions), which exploded, leaving behind only smoke and flames. On July 31, after Sawfish had reported a convoy contact off Luzon, Tilefish set course to intercept the enemy ships but never found the quarry. Tilefish fueled at Midway Island before completing her second patrol at Pearl Harbor on August 15.

Third and fourth war patrols

Tilefish departed Oahu on September 10, 1944. This patrol, conducted in the Sea of Okhotsk and off the Kuril Islands, was made difficult by rough seas which produced swells reaching heights of 30 to 40 feet (9 to 12 m). Despite the problems imposed by high seas, Tilefish sank a small trawler with her four-inch (102 mm) gun on September 23. On October 3, she destroyed two small cargo vessels as they were leaving Hitokappu Bay of Iturup. On October 6, Tilefish claimed two more kills—a cargo ship and a wooden-hulled antisubmarine vessel.During the mid-watch on 13 October, an adventurous owl came on board. The feathered seafarer was promptly dubbed Boris Hootski and made official ship's mascot. On October 16 she sank the Japanese guard boat Kyowa Maru No.2 (108 GRT) On October 17, to prevent its being salvaged, she blew out the stern of a vessel grounded west of Japan's Shimushiru Island (today the Russian island Simushir). Tilefish ended her third patrol at Midway Island on October 24, 1944.

On 15 November, Tilefish got underway for the Kuril Islands. During the first half of this patrol, she operated in northern waters but was hampered by bitterly cold weather, poor visibility, and hurricane-force winds. The mountainous waves forced the submarine to submerge to ride out the storm. On November 25, Tilefish entered the Sea of Okhotsk to patrol the coast of Shimushiru Island. Snow frosted the periscope and prevented accurate identification of possible targets. By 16 December, Tilefish had moved south to take up a lifeguard station off Najima Saki. On the morning of December 22, she sank Chidori, a torpedo boat [758 tons], and evaded a Japanese counterattack of depth charges and aerial bombs without damage. She departed the patrol area on December 24 and arrived at Pearl Harbor on January 2, 1945.

Fifth and sixth war patrols

Walter F. Schlech, Jr. En route, she participated in exercises and searched for the survivors of a downed American plane. Underway from Saipan on February 13, Tilefish proceeded independently to her patrol area in the Nansei Shoto where she prowled the traffic lanes in search of targets. She reported sinking a 90-ton cargo ship (Sampan)[?]in a morning gun attack on February 28 before taking up a lifeguard station in support of planned strikes on Amami Shima. On March 1, she rescued a flier from aircraft carrier  whose plane had splashed and sank only 500 yards off the starboard bow of the submarine. On March 4 She sent a fishing trawler "Shiko Maru" to the bottom off Setsuko Saki, 28°15'N, 129°08'E. On the following day, in the course of a day-long attack on the 2812 ton freighter "Hangzhou Maru" (evaded attacks), she sank a Japanese minesweeper (W 15 500 tons)) which was escorting the cargo ship [W 15 was run aground but was a total loss].. From March 10 to March 19, she performed lifeguard duties in support of strikes on Nagoya and other Japanese targets. After patrolling the approaches to Tokyo Bay on March 22, Tilefish set course, via Midway Island and Pearl Harbor, for San Francisco, California where she was overhauled.

Tilefish returned to Pearl Harbor on July 11 and was soon underway for Midway Island and Saipan. When the war in the Pacific ended, Tilefish was on lifeguard station off the Ryukyu Islands. She continued lifeguard duties and patrols in the western Pacific until September 7 when she returned to Pearl Harbor. Early in 1946, Tilefish returned to San Francisco, California, and operated off the West Coast throughout most of the year. In May, she participated in "wolfpack" exercises and in September took part in live load training, using the hulk of the former SS Schuyler Colfax as a target. In October, she made a brief trip to the Hawaiian Islands and then returned to the West Coast. From January 1947 to September 1950, Tilefish continued to operate out of California ports with occasional voyages to Pearl Harbor. During this period, she conducted underway training and took part in fleet exercises off the West Coast.

Post World War II service

On September 5, 1950, Tilefish departed Pearl Harbor for Japan. From September 28, 1950 through March 24, 1951, the submarine operated out of Japanese ports conducting patrols in Korean waters in support of the United Nations campaign in Korea. She made reconnaissance patrols of La Perouse Strait to keep the Commander, Naval Forces Far East, informed of Soviet seaborne activity in that area. After this tour, the submarine resumed her routine of operations out of Hawaiian and West Coast ports until 1957. Highlights of this period were convoy attack exercises in Hawaiian waters and a goodwill visit to Acapulco, Mexico, early in June 1956.

Following a period of reduced status and overhaul, Tilefish again got underway in April 1957 for Far Eastern waters. During this deployment, she visited ports in Japan and the Ryukyu Islands before completing the cruise at San Diego, California, on September 27, 1957.

On September 16, 1958, the veteran submarine made way via Pearl Harbor for Midway Island and the Marshall Islands. With four civilian geophysicists on board from the Hydrographic Office, the submarine completed a submerged survey of Eniwetok, Wake, and Midway Island, operating at sea for nearly three months. She returned to San Diego, California, on December 5, 1958 for inactivation.

Tilefish was decommissioned on October 12, 1959, underwent overhaul at the San Francisco Naval Shipyard, and was recommissioned on January 30, 1960. Her final decommissioning was in May 1960. She was struck from the Naval Vessel Register on December 1, 1960, and sold to the Venezuelan government.

ARV Carite (S-11)

The ex-Tilefish, now commissioned as ARV Carite (S-11), served in the Armada Venezolana (the Venezuelan Navy) for 16 years. In 1969 and 1970, she played the part of a German U-boat hiding in the Orinoco River during the filming of the movie Murphy's War. For the role, she was modified by the addition of a "cigarette deck" aft of her sail and was painted in a "dazzle" camouflage pattern.

Carite was decommissioned by the Venezuelan Navy on January 28, 1977 and cannibalized for spare parts.

Awards

Tilefish received five battle stars for World War II service. She received one battle star for Korean War service.

References

External links
 Photo gallery  at navsource.org

Balao-class submarines
Ships built in Vallejo, California
1943 ships
World War II submarines of the United States
Cold War submarines of the United States
Korean War submarines of the United States
Ships transferred from the United States Navy to the Bolivarian Navy of Venezuela
Balao-class submarines of the Bolivarian Navy of Venezuela